Ancient tree may refer to:

 Trees in ancient woodland
 Veteran trees, individual trees noteworthy for their age
 Ancient Tree Inventory, a project of the Woodland Trust to catalogue ancient and veteran trees
 Trees in Paleobotany, which may be fossilised
 Significant in the formation of coal
 Fossil wood, fossils of ancient trees

See also
 List of oldest trees
 Old Trees, a national historic district in New York